Murad Mirza (Persian: مراد میرزا) (15 June 1570 – 12 May 1599) was a Mughal prince as the second surviving son of Mughal Emperor Akbar. He was the maternal grandfather of Nadira Banu Begum, wife of Prince Dara Shikoh (eldest son of the emperor Shah Jahan).

Birth and education

According to the Tuzk-e-Jahangiri, he was a son of Akbar, born from a royal serving-girl.  He was entrusted for his first few years to Salima Sultan Begum for the upbringing and returned to his mother's care in 1575 as Salima begum left for Hajj.

Murad was first educated by Abu'l-Fazl ibn Mubarak and, as from 1580, by Jesuit priests Antonio de Montserrat (as a tutor) and Francisco Aquaviva, who were called up by Akbar himself to teach Murad Portuguese and the basics of Christianity.

Murad became the first Mughal prince to be educated by western Jesuit priests or, as Dr. Oscar R. Gómez points out, the first person to be educated in the paradigmatic model driven by Murad's father Jalaluddin Muhammad Akbar, the 3rd Dalai Lama Sonam Gyatso, and Jesuit Antonio de Montserrat, which resulted in the current existentialist model.

Hence, Sultan Murad Pahari has become the first person resulting from the amalgamation of Tibetan tantric Buddhism, Islam, and Christianity.

Military command
In 1577 (at the age of seven), Murad was awarded his first military rank, receiving a mansab of 7000 men. In 1584, after he attained puberty, this was enhanced to 9000 men. From 1593 Prince Murad was in command of the army in the Deccan. He was ineffective in command largely due to his drunkenness.  His condition led to his replacement by Abu'l-Fazl, who arrived at Murad's camp in early May.

Later life and death 
Due to his failed expedition to Ahmadnagar, Murad Mirza fell into chronic grief and was pushed further into despair on the death of his son, Rustum and turned to excessive drinking. This excessive drinking lead to illnesses like epilepsy and chronic indigestion.

In February 1599, Murad started his march towards Ahmadnagar in order to avoid going to Agra and meeting the Emperor. On 6 May 1599, he had a severe seizure and subsequently died in an unconscious state on 12 May, near Ahmadnagar.

Family
One of Prince Murad's wives was Habiba Banu Begum, the daughter of Mirza Aziz Koka, Known as Khan Azam. He was the son of Akbar's milk mother, Jiji Anga. The marriage took place on 15 May 1587, when Murad was seventeen. She was the mother of Prince Rustam Mirza born on 27 August 1588 and died on 30 November 1597, and Prince Alam Sultan Mirza born on 4 November 1590 and died in infancy.

Another of his wives was the daughter of Bahadur Khan, the son, and successor of Raja Ali Khan, ruler of Khandesh. Akbar arranged this marriage, in order to exact more help from Khandesh for the Mughals' future operations in the Deccan. His only daughter Princess Jahan Banu Begum was married to Prince Parviz Mirza, son of Emperor Jahangir. This marriage was held at the palace of his mother, Mariam-uz-Zamani.

Governorships
 Malwa 1590–1594
 Berar 1596–1599
 Assam 1595–1597

References

Bibliography
 

1570 births
1599 deaths
Mughal princes
Akbar
Mariam-uz-Zamani